Breukhoven is a surname. Notable people with the surname include: 

Arjan Breukhoven (born 1962), Dutch musician
Hans Breukhoven (1946–2017), Dutch businessman